The 1968 NCAA Men's Soccer Tournament was the tenth organized men's college soccer tournament by the National Collegiate Athletic Association, to determine the top college soccer team in the United States. The Michigan State Spartans and the Maryland Terrapins were co-national champions after the championship game ended in a 2–2 tie after two overtime periods. This was Michigan State's second and Maryland's first national title. The final match was played on December 7, 1968, in Atlanta.

Tournament bracket

Final

See also
 1968 NAIA Soccer Championship

References 

Championship
NCAA Division I Men's Soccer Tournament seasons
NCAA
NCAA University Division Soccer Tournament
NCAA University Division Soccer Tournament